The Getty Center, in Los Angeles, California, is a campus of the Getty Museum and other programs of the Getty Trust. The $1.3 billion center opened to the public on December 16, 1997 and is well known for its architecture, gardens, and views overlooking Los Angeles. The center sits atop a hill connected to a visitors' parking garage at the bottom of the hill by a three-car, cable-pulled hovertrain people mover.

Located in the Brentwood neighborhood of Los Angeles, the center is one of two locations of the J. Paul Getty Museum and draws 1.8 million visitors annually. (The other location is the Getty Villa in the Pacific Palisades neighborhood of Los Angeles, California.) The center branch of the museum features pre-20th-century European paintings, drawings, illuminated manuscripts, sculpture, and decorative arts; and photographs from the 1830s through present day from all over the world. In addition, the museum's collection at the center includes outdoor sculpture displayed on terraces and in gardens and the large Central Garden designed by Robert Irwin. Among the artworks on display is the Vincent van Gogh painting Irises.

Designed by architect Richard Meier, the campus also houses the Getty Research Institute (GRI), the Getty Conservation Institute, the Getty Foundation, and the J. Paul Getty Trust. The center's design included special provisions to address concerns regarding earthquakes and fires.

Location and history

Originally, the Getty Museum started in J. Paul Getty's house located in Pacific Palisades in 1954. He expanded the house with a museum wing. In the 1970s, Getty built a replica of an Italian villa on his home's land to better house his collection, which opened in 1974. After Getty's death in 1976, the entire property was turned over to the Getty Trust for museum purposes. However, the collection outgrew the site, which has since been renamed the Getty Villa, and management sought a location more accessible to Los Angeles.

The price tag of the center totaled $733 million which includes $449 million for construction, $115 million for the land and site work, $30 million for fixtures and equipment, and $139 million for insurance, engineers' and architects' fees, permits and safety measures, according to Stephen D. Rountree, former director of the Getty's building program and director of operations and planning for the trust.

Current appraisal for the property fluctuates with the market, but in June 2013 the land and buildings were estimated at $3.853 billion (art not included).

In 1984, Richard Meier was chosen to be the architect of the center. After an extensive conditional-use permit process, construction by the Hathaway Dinwiddie Construction Company began in August 1989. The construction was significantly delayed, with the planned completion date moved from 1988 to 1995 (as of 1990). By 1995, however, the campus was described as only "more than halfway complete".

The center ultimately opened to the public on December 16, 1997. Although the total project cost was estimated to be $350 million as of 1990, it was later estimated to be $1.3 billion. After the center opened, the villa closed for extensive renovations and reopened on January 28, 2006, to focus on the arts and cultures of ancient Greece, Rome, and Etruria. Currently, the museum displays collections at both the Getty Center and the Getty Villa in Pacific Palisades.

In 2005, after a series of articles in the Los Angeles Times about the spending practices of the Getty Trust and its then-president Dr. Barry Munitz, the California Attorney General conducted an investigation of the Getty Trust and found that no laws had been broken. The trust agreed to appoint an outside monitor to review future expenditures. The Getty Trust experienced financial difficulties in 2008 and 2009 and cut 205 of 1,487 budgeted staff positions to reduce expenses. Although the Getty Trust endowment reached $6.4 billion in 2007, it dropped to $4.5 billion in 2009. The endowment rebounded to $6.2 billion by 2013.

Architecture 

Meier has exploited the two naturally-occurring ridges (which diverge at a 22.5 degree angle) by overlaying two grids along these axes. These grids serve to define the space of the campus while dividing the import of the buildings on it. Along one axis lie the galleries and along the other axis lie the administrative buildings. Meier emphasized the two competing grids by constructing strong view lines through the campus. The main north–south axis starts with the helipad, then includes a narrow walkway between the auditorium and north buildings, continues past the elevator kiosk to the tram station, through the rotunda, past the walls and support columns of the exhibitions pavilion, and finally the ramp besides the west pavilion and the central garden. Its corresponding east–west visual axis starts with the edge of the scholar's wing of the Getty Research Institute (GRI), the walkway between the central garden and the GRI, the overlook to the azalea pool in the central garden, the walkway between the central garden and the west pavilion, and finally the north wall of the west pavilion and the courtyard between the south and east pavilions.

The main axes of the museum grid that is offset by 22.5 degrees begins with the arrival plaza, carries through the edge of the stairs up to the main entrance, aligns with the columns supporting the rotunda as well as the center point of the rotunda, aligns with travertine benches in the courtyard between the pavilions, includes a narrow walkway between the west and south pavilions, a staircase down to the cactus garden and ends in the garden. The corresponding cross axis starts with the center point of the circle forming the GRI library garden, then passing to the center of the entrance rotunda, and aligning with the south wall of the rotunda building. Although all of the museum is aligned on these alternative axes, portions of the exhibitions pavilion and the east pavilion are aligned on the true north–south axis as a reminder that both grids are present in the campus.

The primary grid structure is a  square; most wall and floor elements are  squares or some derivative thereof. The buildings at the Getty Center are made from concrete and steel with either travertine or aluminium cladding. Around  of travertine was used to build the center.

Throughout the campus, numerous fountains provide white noise as a background. The initial design has remained intact; however benches and fences have been installed around the plaza fountains to discourage visitors from wading into the pools. Some additional revisions have been made in deference to the Americans with Disabilities Act.

The north promontory is anchored by a circular grass area, which serves as a heliport in case of emergencies, and the south promontory is anchored by a succulent plant and cactus garden. The complex is also encircled by access roads that lead to loading docks and staff parking garages on both the west and east sides of the buildings. The hillside around the complex has been planted with California Live Oak (Quercus agrifolia) trees.

The museum has a seven-story deep underground parking garage with over 1,200 parking spaces. Its roof has an outdoor sculpture garden. An automated three-car, cable-pulled hovertrain people mover, the "Getty Center Tram", takes passengers between the parking garage at the bottom of the hill and the museum at the top of the hill.

Arrival court and central rotunda

Visitors typically arrive at a tram station in the arrival plaza located between the administrative buildings and the museum entrance. A large set of steps leads to the main doors of the rotunda building. The rotunda building houses information desks, two orientation theatres and museum shops. It also holds a grand staircase that starts a path toward the paintings located on the second floor of each art pavilion. The rotunda opens to the south to a terrace that links all five of the museum pavilions. A separate building to the west of the arrival plaza and stairs holds a cafeteria and restaurant. Next to the restaurant is a stone arch, which separates the museum from the GRI. Stairs from the terrace connecting the GRI and the restaurant lead down to the central garden.

Parking garage 
The Getty Center also has a seven-story underground parking garage for visitors use as they visit the center.

Museum 

The J. Paul Getty Museum's estimated 1.8 million visitors annually make it one of the most visited museums in the United States. The collection of the J. Paul Getty Museum on display at the Getty Center includes "pre-20th-century European paintings, drawings, illuminated manuscripts, sculpture, and decorative arts; and 19th- and 20th-century American and European photographs". The paintings include:

 Arii Matamoe (The Royal End) by Paul Gauguin (1892). The museum's director, Michael Brand, stated that the purchase of the painting was "one of the key moments in the history of our collection". The literal translation of the Tahitian words of the title are "noble" and "sleeping eyes", which implies "death".
 Irises by Vincent van Gogh (1889). The museum purchased the painting in 1990; it had sold for $53.9 million in 1987.
 Portrait of a Halberdier by Pontormo (1528–1530). When the museum bought the painting for $35.2 million at an auction in 1989, "the price more than tripled the previous record at auction for an Old Master painting".
 A copy of Portrait of Louis XIV, which measures 114 x 62-5/8 inches, by the workshop of Hyacinthe Rigaud (after 1701).
Getty's extensive photograph collection is located on the lower level of the west pavilion.

The museum building consists of a three-level base building that is closed to the public and provides staff workspace and storage areas. Five public, two-story towers on the base are called the North, East, South, West and the Exhibitions Pavilions. The Exhibitions Pavilion acts as the temporary residence for traveling art collections and the Foundation's artwork for which the permanent pavilions have no room. The permanent collection is displayed throughout the other four pavilions chronologically: the north houses the oldest art while the west houses the newest. The first-floor galleries in each pavilion house light-sensitive art, such as illuminated manuscripts, furniture, or photography. Computer-controlled skylights on the second-floor galleries allow paintings to be displayed in natural light. The second floors are connected by a series of glass-enclosed bridges and open terraces, both of which offer views of the surrounding hillsides and central plaza. Sculpture is also on display at various points outside the buildings, including on various terraces and balconies. The lower level (the highest of the floors in the base) includes a public cafeteria, the terrace cafe, and the photography galleries.

Central Garden 

The  Central Garden at the Getty Center is the work of artist Robert Irwin. Planning for the garden began in 1992, construction started in 1996, and the garden was completed in December 1997.

Irwin was quoted as saying that the Central Garden "is a sculpture in the form of a garden, which aims to be art". Water plays a major role in the garden. A fountain near the restaurant flows toward the garden and appears to fall into a grotto on the north garden wall. The resulting stream then flows down the hillside into the azalea pool. The designers placed rocks and boulders of varying size in the stream bed to vary the sounds from the flowing water. A tree-lined stream descends to a plaza, while the walkway criss-crosses the stream, which continues through the plaza, and goes over a stone waterfall into a round pool. A maze of azaleas floats in the pool, around which is a series of specialty gardens. More than 500 varieties of plant material are used for the Central Garden, but the selection is "always changing, never twice the same".

After the original design, an outdoor sculpture garden, called the "Lower Terrace Garden" was added in 2007 on the west side of the central garden just below the scholar's wing of the GRI building.

Getty Research Institute (GRI) 

The Getty Research Institute (GRI) is "dedicated to furthering knowledge and advancing understanding of the visual arts". Among other holdings, GRI's research library contains over 900,000 volumes of books, periodicals, and auction catalogs; special collections; and two million photographs of art and architecture. GRI's other activities include exhibitions, publications, and a residential scholars program. At the Getty Center, GRI is located to the west of the museum. The round building encircles a landscaped garden and is located to the west of the central garden. The main entrance of GRI is connected by a terrace to the main arrival court of the museum, with outdoor sculptures placed along the route. GRI has one art gallery on its entrance level that is open to the public.

Other offices 

Meier also designed three other buildings located next to the north promontory and offset at a 22.5 degree angle from the main axis of the museum pavilions. The north-most building is an auditorium. Next to it is the North Building, with the East Building sitting between the North Building and the rotunda. The main entrance to the East Building is flanked by two round silos that hold its elevators. A bridge over a sunken courtyard links the main entrance of the East Building to the main walkway that connects the auditorium and North Buildings to the rotunda. These buildings house the Getty Conservation Institute (GCI), the J. Paul Getty Trust and the Getty Foundation. These buildings are generally closed to the public except for special events held in the auditorium. They are linked to the museum both by landscaped terraces and by an enclosed glass walkway that leads from the main rotunda.

GCI, which is headquartered at the Getty Center but also has facilities at the Getty Villa, commenced operation in 1985. It "serves the conservation community through scientific research, education and training, model field projects, and the dissemination of the results of both its own work and the work of others in the field" and "adheres to the principles that guide the work of the Getty Trust: service, philanthropy, teaching, and access". GCI has activities in both art conservation and architectural conservation.

The Getty Foundation awards grants for "the understanding and preservation of the visual arts". In addition, it runs the Getty Leadership Institute for "current and future museum leaders". Its offices are north of the museum. The foundation offices are located in the two administrative buildings that are north of the museum. The J. Paul Getty Trust, which oversees the Getty Conservation Institute, Getty Foundation, Getty Research Institute, and J. Paul Getty Museum, also has offices there.

Preparation for natural disasters

Earthquakes

Although the center's site was thought to have little motion during earthquakes, which are frequent in the Los Angeles area, in 1994, as the center was being constructed, the Northridge earthquake struck. It caused "disturbing hairline cracks... in the welds and plated joints of the steel framework". As a result, the steelwork through the site was retrofitted. The center's buildings are thought to be able to survive an earthquake of 7.5 magnitude on the Richter scale.

Fires
In the 16 electrical transformers at the center, silicone fluid is used as a coolant "with less risk of ignition" than hydrocarbon coolant. The native flammable chaparral was removed and fire-resistant poverty weed was added to the slopes around the center. Each year, a herd of goats is rented to clear brush on the surrounding hills.

The access ramp from the entry plaza to the museum was constructed to allow a fire truck to pass over it. Inside the museum, the sprinkler system is designed to balance "between the potential damage of a fire and the risk of water damage to valuable artwork".

Panoramic view looking south

References

Further reading

External links 

 The Getty
 J. Paul Getty Museum
 Architecture of the Getty Center (800 photographs categorized by location and by subject of photograph)
 Gardens of the Getty Center (LandLiving.com)
 Microsoft Virtual Earth view of the Center at a different angle

Art museums and galleries in Los Angeles
Museums in Los Angeles
Museums of American art
Photography museums and galleries in the United States
Sculpture gardens, trails and parks in California
Center
Art in Greater Los Angeles
Outdoor sculptures in Greater Los Angeles
Brentwood, Los Angeles
Santa Monica Mountains
Sepulveda Boulevard
Westside (Los Angeles County)
Museums established in 1997
Buildings and structures completed in 1997
1997 establishments in California
Richard Meier buildings
Modernist architecture in California